Mum's the Word or Mom's the Word may refer to:

Film
 Mum's the Word (film), a 1996 Canadian documentary short film

Television
"Mom's the Word", a 2014 episode of Family Guy
"Mom's the Word!", a 1988 episode of The Raccoons

Other uses
 Mum's the word, an English idiom